Hichem is a given name for males. People named Hichem include:

 Hichem Essifi, Tunisian footballer
 Hichem Hamdouchi, Moroccan chess player
 Hichem Mechichi, Prime Minister of Tunisia
 Hichem Rostom, Tunisian actor
 Hichem Samandi, Tunisian fencer
 Hichem Yacoubi, Moroccan actor

Arabic masculine given names